Thomas Howard, 2nd Duke of Norfolk  (144321 May 1524), styled Earl of Surrey from 1483 to 1485 and again from 1489 to 1514, was an English nobleman, soldier and statesman who served four monarchs. He was the eldest son of John Howard, 1st Duke of Norfolk, by his first wife, Catharina de Moleyns. The Duke was the grandfather of both Queen Anne Boleyn and Queen Catherine Howard and the great-grandfather of Queen Elizabeth I. In 1513 he led the English to victory over the Scots at the decisive Battle of Flodden, for which he was richly rewarded by King Henry VIII, then away in France.

Early life
Thomas Howard was born in 1443 at Stoke-by-Nayland, Suffolk, the only surviving son of John Howard, later 1st Duke of Norfolk, by his first wife, Katherine, the daughter of Sir William Moleyns (died 8 June 1425) and his wife Margery. He was educated at Thetford Grammar School.

Service under Edward IV
While a young man, he entered the service of King Edward IV as a henchman. Howard took the King's side when war broke out in 1469 with the Earl of Warwick, and took sanctuary at Colchester when the King fled to Holland in 1470. Howard rejoined the royal forces at Edward's return to England in 1471, and was severely wounded at the Battle of Barnet on 14 April 1471. He was appointed an esquire of the body in 1473. On 14 January 1478 he was knighted by Edward IV at the marriage of the King's second son, the young Duke of York, and Lady Anne Mowbray (died 1481).

Service under Richard III
After the death of Edward IV on 9 April 1483, Thomas Howard and his father John supported Richard III. Thomas bore the Sword of State at Richard's coronation and served as steward at the coronation banquet. Both Thomas and his father were granted lands by the new King, and Thomas was also granted an annuity of £1000. On 28 June 1483, John Howard was created Duke of Norfolk, while Thomas was created Earl of Surrey. Surrey was also sworn of the Privy Council and invested with the Order of the Garter. In the autumn of that year Norfolk and Surrey suppressed a rebellion against the King by the Duke of Buckingham. Both Howards remained close to King Richard throughout his two-year reign, and fought for him at the Battle of Bosworth in 1485, where Surrey was wounded and taken prisoner, and his father killed. Surrey was attainted in the first Parliament of the new King, Henry VII, stripped of his lands, and committed to the Tower of London, where he spent the next three years.

Service under Henry VII

Howard was offered an opportunity to escape during the rebellion of the Earl of Lincoln in 1487, but refused, perhaps thereby convincing Henry VII of his loyalty. In May 1489 Henry restored him to the earldom of Surrey, although most of his lands were withheld, and sent him to quell a rebellion in Yorkshire. Surrey remained in the north as the King's lieutenant until 1499. He and his family lived in Sheriff Hutton Castle while in North. In 1499 he was recalled to court, and accompanied the King on a state visit to France in the following year. In 1501 he was again appointed a member of the Privy Council, and on 16 June of that year was made Lord High Treasurer. Surrey, Richard Foxe (Bishop of Winchester and Lord Privy Seal) and William Warham (Archbishop of Canterbury and Lord Chancellor), became the King's "executive triumvirate". He was entrusted with a number of diplomatic missions. In 1501 he was involved in the negotiations for Catherine of Aragon's marriage to Arthur, Prince of Wales, and in 1503 conducted Margaret Tudor to Scotland for her wedding to King James IV.

Service under Henry VIII
 

Surrey was an executor of the will of King Henry VII when the King died on 21 April 1509, and played a prominent role in the coronation of King Henry VIII, in which he served as Earl Marshal. He challenged Thomas Wolsey in an effort to become the new King's first minister, but eventually accepted Wolsey's supremacy. Surrey expected to lead the 1513 expedition to France, but was left behind when the King departed for Calais on 30 June 1513. Shortly thereafter King James IV of Scotland launched an invasion into England, and Surrey, with the aid of other noblemen and his sons Thomas and Edmund, crushed James's much larger force at the Battle of Flodden, near Branxton, Northumberland, on 9 September 1513. The Scots may have lost as many as 10,000 men, and King James was killed. The victory at Flodden brought Surrey great popular renown and royal rewards. On 1 February 1514, he was created Duke of Norfolk, and his son Thomas was made Earl of Surrey. Both were granted lands and annuities, and the Howard arms were augmented in honour of Flodden with an inescutcheon bearing the lion of Scotland pierced through the mouth with an arrow, within a double tressure flory-counterflory-gules, an emblem of the Scottish royal arms on rare occasion granted by Scottish kings to a favoured follower as a special mark of favour. The grant by Henry VIII to Howard was thus a blatant heraldic insult to the kings of Scotland.

Final years
In the final decade of his life, Norfolk continued his career as a courtier, diplomat and soldier. In 1514 he joined Wolsey and Foxe in negotiating the marriage of Mary Tudor to King Louis XII of France, and escorted her to France for the wedding. On 1 May 1517, he led a private army of 1,300 retainers into London to suppress the Evil May Day riots. In May 1521 he presided as Lord High Steward over the trial of Edward Stafford, 3rd Duke of Buckingham. According to David M. Head, "he pronounced the sentence of death with tears streaming down his face".

By the spring of 1522, Norfolk was almost 80 years of age and in failing health. He withdrew from court, resigned as Lord Treasurer in favour of his son in December of that year, and after attending the opening of Parliament in April 1523, retired to his ducal castle at Framlingham in Suffolk where he died on 21 May 1524. His funeral and burial on 22 June at Thetford Priory were said to have been "spectacular and enormously expensive, costing over £1300 and including a procession of 400 hooded men bearing torches and an elaborate bier surmounted with 100 wax effigies and 700 candles", befitting the richest and most powerful peer in England. After the dissolution of Thetford Priory, the Howard tombs were moved to the Church of St Michael the Archangel, Framlingham. A now-lost monumental brass depicting the 2nd Duke was formerly in the Church of St. Mary at Lambeth.

Marriages and issue
On 30 April 1472, Howard married Elizabeth Tilney, the daughter of Sir Frederick Tilney of Ashwellthorpe, Norfolk, and widow of Sir Humphrey Bourchier, slain at Barnet, son and heir apparent of Sir John Bourchier, 1st Baron Berners. They had issue:

 Thomas Howard, 3rd Duke of Norfolk
 Sir Edward Howard
 Lord Edmund Howard, father of Henry VIII's fifth Queen, Catherine Howard
 Sir John Howard
 Henry Howard
 Charles Howard
 Henry Howard (the younger)
 Richard Howard
 Elizabeth Howard, married Thomas Boleyn, 1st Earl of Wiltshire, and was mother of Queen Anne Boleyn, and grandmother of Queen Elizabeth.
 Muriel Howard (died 1512), married firstly John Grey, 2nd Viscount Lisle (died 1504), and secondly Sir Thomas Knyvet

Norfolk's first wife died on 4 April 1497, and on 8 November 1497 he married, by dispensation dated 17 August 1497, her cousin, Agnes Tilney, the daughter of Hugh Tilney of Skirbeck and Boston, Lincolnshire and Eleanor, a daughter of Walter Tailboys. They had issue:
 William Howard, 1st Baron Howard of Effingham
 Lord Thomas Howard (1511–1537)
 Richard Howard (died 1517)
 Dorothy Howard, married Edward Stanley, 3rd Earl of Derby
 Anne Howard, married John de Vere, 14th Earl of Oxford
 Catherine Howard, married firstly, Rhys ap Gruffydd. Married secondly, Henry Daubeney, 1st Earl of Bridgewater.
 Elizabeth Howard (died 1536), married Henry Radclyffe, 2nd Earl of Sussex.
Note: Thomas Howard indeed had two living daughters named Elizabeth Howard and two living sons named Thomas Howard. It is unclear if he had two sons named Richard as well or if it was the same person. In the Dukes of Norfolk family tree, there is clearly a mistake. Richard Howard is there linked to Agnes Tilney (2nd wife of Thomas Howard), yet is said to born in 1487, which is impossible to be true, as at the time Thomas Howard was married to Elizabeth Tilney.

Footnotes

References
 
 
 
 
 
 
 
 
 
 
 
 
 
 
 
 
 
Attribution:

Further reading
 Harris, Barbara. "Marriage Sixteenth-Century Style: Elizabeth Stafford and the Third Duke of Norfolk," Journal of Social History, Spring 1982, Vol. 15 Issue 3;
 Head, David M. Ebbs & Flows of Fortune: The Life of Thomas Howard, Third Duke of Norfolk (1995), 360pp; the standard scholarly biography of the third duke
Tucker, Melvin J., "The Life of Thomas Howard, earl of Surrey and second Duke of Norfolk (1964), 170pp' out of print but the only serious biography

External links
 Dukes of Norfolk (Howard), Medieval Lands website by Charles Cawley
 Flodden: Scotland's Greatest Defeat

302
Barons Mowbray
14
Thomas Howard, 02nd Duke of Norfolk
301
People of the Wars of the Roses
Lord High Stewards
Lord High Treasurers of England
Earls Marshal
Garter Knights appointed by Richard III
People educated at Ipswich School
1443 births
1524 deaths
Male Shakespearean characters
Prisoners in the Tower of London
People educated at Thetford Grammar School
16th-century English politicians